Russell Creek may refer to:

Russell Creek (Georgia)
Russell Creek (Ontario)
Russell Creek, Virginia